Gogodala may refer to:

 Gogodala people
 Gogodala languages
Gogodala language
Gogodala Rural LLG, Papua New Guinea